The women's giant slalom at the 1956 Winter Olympics was held on 27 January in Cortina d'Ampezzo, Italy. It was run on the Canalone run on Mount Tofana. There were 46 gates that the women had to navigate. Forty-four women from sixteen countries competed. German skier Ossi Reichert won the event while Austrians won silver and bronze.

Medalists

Source:

Results

See also

 1956 Winter Olympics

Notes

References
 

Women's alpine skiing at the 1956 Winter Olympics
Alp
Oly